Come In On This was an Australian television series which aired during 1959 on Melbourne station ABV-2. Compered by Robert Peach, the series aired at 9:30PM on Mondays. It aired fortnightly and was broadcast live. Competition in the timeslot consisted of U.S. western series Trackdown on HSV-7 and the locally produced live variety series In Melbourne Tonight on GTV-9.

Format
Robert Peach would ask members of the studio audience for their opinions on various subjects. The audience would be members of a particular organisation or group.

See also
Leave It to the Girls - Panel discussion series
The Critics - Panel discussion series
Any Questions - Panel discussion series

References

External links

Australian live television series
1959 Australian television series debuts
1959 Australian television series endings
Australian non-fiction television series
Australian Broadcasting Corporation original programming
Black-and-white Australian television shows
English-language television shows